Betty Ethel Holton (30 January 1926 – 17 January 2013), better known by her stage name, Lizbeth Webb, was an English soprano and stage actress.  Known as "the champagne soprano", she is remembered partly for originating the song "This Is My Lovely Day".

After performing as a dance band vocalist and entertaining British troops during World War II, Webb pursued a career in West End musicals, becoming known for her vivaciousness in playing such roles as Lucy Willow in Bless the Bride, Linda in Ivor Novello's Gay's the Word and Sarah Brown in Guys and Dolls.  She married Colonel Guy Campbell, the heir to a baronetcy, and left the stage in the late 1950s, bringing up two sons but returning for a last engagement in the title role of The Merry Widow in 1969.

Early life and career
Webb was born in Reading, Berkshire, the last of three children of Frederick Holton, a locomotive engine driver, and his wife Ethel, née Strutt (1895–1926). Webb's mother died in childbirth, and she was adopted by her aunt and uncle, Ethel and Alfred Wills Webber. Her sister and brother were adopted by other aunts. She attended E. P. Collier Primary School, where she was known as Betty Webber. She later went on to Hemdean House School and Queen Anne's School, both in Caversham, Reading.  As a child, she excelled at rowing, swimming and running. From an early age, she took singing lessons.

She began her career as a teenage band vocalist and on BBC radio under the name Betty Webb, singing to the troops during World War II and freelancing with British bands, often for Jack Payne, who discovered her, and also for Albert Sandler, Henry Hall, Louis Levy and Geraldo.  She generally performed two or three live broadcasts daily during the height of the German air-raids.  She was also a regular on programmes such as Happidrome, Workers Playtime, Kaleidoscope, "Music Hall", Variety Bandbox, Four and Twenty, The Forces Show with Diana Dors, Jack Buchanan and Bob Monkhouse, Follies of the Air with Sonnie Hale, Home at Eight with Hermione Gingold and Richard Attenborough, and Friday Night Is Music Night. Among the conductors she sang with were George Melachrino, Mantovani, Richard Tauber, Harry Rabinowitz, Stanley Black, Max Jaffa, Charles Mackerras, both Eric and Stanford Robinson and Vilém Tauský.

In addition to entertaining the Allied troops, she took part in propaganda broadcasts of German light music, often in German, working with Mischa Spoliansky, and sketches with upbeat tales of life in Britain.  This placed her on potential Nazi death lists.

West End success
After an introduction from Geraldo, in 1946, the impresario Charles B. Cochran engaged her to work for him and changed her name to Lizbeth Webb.  She first understudied and then took over the lead, Grace Green, in Vivian Ellis and A. P. Herbert's parliamentary satire Big Ben at the Adelphi Theatre in London and on tour (1946). Ellis and Herbert wrote a leading role for her the next year, Lucy Willow, in the hit musical Bless the Bride, in which her character leaves a stuffy English fiancé, who she does not love, to elope with a brave and dashing Frenchman, played by Georges Guétary.  One of her songs with Guétary, "This Is My Lovely Day", became one of the BBC's most requested songs of all time, and the song's popularity, and that of the show, were increased by their association with the wedding in 1947 of Princess Elizabeth and Lt. Philip Mountbatten (later Queen Elizabeth and Prince Philip). The show's sweeping score also included another popular song for Webb and Guétary, "I Was Never Kissed Before".  Oklahoma! opened in the West End the same year as Bless the Bride, but the British musical was not overshadowed by the American hit, enjoying a good reception from the critics and audiences and running for more than two years and 886 performances. Webb became known as "The Champagne Soprano", and she was admired on stage for her "vibrancy and vivacity".

Webb played in pantomime, including the role of Dick Whittington in 1950, and starred as Cinderella opposite the stars of The Goon Show in 1951 on The Light Programme.  Ivor Novello wrote the role of Linda especially for Webb in his last musical, Gay's the Word.

Webb died in 2013, two weeks before her 87th birthday.

Notes

References
Green, Stanley. Encyclopedia of the Musical Theatre, Da Capo Press, 1980, 
"Bless the Bride" feature.  Theatre World Magazine, No. 270, July 1947

External links
Credits at broadwayworld.com

Radio4's "Last Word" obituary show, 1 February 2013 @5:45

1926 births
People from Reading, Berkshire
English musical theatre actresses
English stage actresses
2013 deaths
English sopranos
Actresses from Berkshire
Musicians from Berkshire
People educated at Queen Anne's School
Wives of baronets